An election for the Members of the European Parliament from Estonia took place on May 26, 2019. Due to the United Kingdom's impending withdrawal from the European Union and the redistribution of its European Parliament seats, the number of elected MEPs from Estonia was increased from six to seven.

Opinion polls 
Poll results are listed in the table below in reverse chronological order, showing the most recent first. The highest percentage figure in each poll is displayed in bold, and the background shaded in the leading party's color. In the instance that there is a tie, then no figure is shaded.

Results

Elected MEPs

References 

Estonia
2019
2019 in Estonia